Cycas yunnanensis is a species of cycad in southwestern China. It is restricted to southern Sichuan and northern Yunnan.

References

yunnanensis